Blainey v Ontario Hockey Association (1986) 54 O.R. (2d) 513 is a famous decision of the Court of Appeal for Ontario on the relationship between the Canadian Charter of Rights and Freedoms and the Ontario Human Rights Code. The Court held that Human Rights Codes in general are statutes and so must conform with the Charter.

Justine Blainey was excluded from playing in the boys hockey league by the Ontario Hockey Association. She was unable to bring a claim against the OHA because the Ontario Human Rights Code contained a provision that allowed male-only sports teams and since the OHA was a private organization the Charter did not apply to it. Instead she challenged the constitutionality of the provision of the Human Rights Code as a violation of the equality provision of the Charter.

The Court held that the exception for sports teams violated section 15 of the Charter in a way that could not be justified under section 1, and struck down the provision. 

The crown sided with Blainey as the Ontario Hockey Association was in violation of section 15 of the charter of rights and freedoms. Justine Blainey was later included in the division.

See also
 List of notable Canadian Courts of Appeal cases

External links
 Full text of the decision

Section Fifteen Charter case law
1986 in Canadian case law
1986 in Ontario
Court of Appeal for Ontario cases
Sports law
Women's rights in Canada
Women's ice hockey in Canada